Call signs in Canada are official identifiers issued to the country's radio and television stations. Assignments for broadcasting stations are made by the Canadian Radio-television and Telecommunications Commission (CRTC), while amateur stations receive their call signs from Innovation, Science and Economic Development Canada (previously Industry Canada). Conventional radio and television broadcasting stations assignments are generally three, four or five letters long (not including the "–FM", "–TV", or "–DT" suffix) and almost exclusively use "C" call signs; with a few exceptions noted below, the "V" calls are restricted to specialized uses such as amateur radio.

Call sign prefixes are coordinated internationally by the International Telecommunication Union (ITU), and Canada has been assigned CF–CK, VA–VG, VO, VX-VY and XJ–XO. "CB" series calls are officially assigned to Chile by the ITU, but Canada makes de facto use of this series for stations belonging to, but not exclusively broadcasting programs from, the Canadian Broadcasting Corporation (CBC).

Special broadcast undertakings such as Internet radio, cable FM, carrier current or closed circuit stations may sometimes be known by unofficial identifiers such as "CSCR". These are not governed by the Canadian media regulation system, and may be letter sequences that would not be permissible for a conventional broadcast station.

Three-letter call signs are only permitted to CBC Radio stations or to commercial stations which received their three-letter call sign before the current rules were adopted.

Assignments
The International Telecommunication Union has assigned Canada the following call sign blocks:

Broadcasting stations
Most broadcasting stations have four-letter call signs (not including the "–FM", "–TV", or "–DT" suffix). Three-letter call signs are only permitted to CBC Radio stations or to commercial stations which received their three-letter call sign before the current rules were adopted. Five-letter call signs exclusively identify CBC transmitters (which may be either rebroadcasters or Ici Radio-Canada Télé owned-and-operated stations outside of Quebec).

Stations of the Canadian Broadcasting Corporation tend to identify themselves as "CBC Radio One"/"CBC Radio Two" (English-language) or "La Première Chaîne"/"Espace Musique" (French-language) of a city, although they do have official three- and four- letter call signs. These generally (but not always) begin with "CB". "VO" call signs may only be used commercially by stations in Newfoundland and Labrador which were licensed before that province joined the Canadian Confederation in 1949 (VOCM, VOAR and VOWR broadcast from St. John's long before confederation). Only one station, VOCM-FM, has been allowed to adopt a "VO" call sign as part of Canada. It was granted the VOCM calls because of its corporate association with the AM station.

Call signs with four digits preceded by "VF" (for radio) or "CH" (for television) are only assigned to very-low-power local services, such as rebroadcasters or limited-interest stations similar to Part 15 operations in the United States. All Canadian FM stations have an "–FM" suffix, except for low-power rebroadcasters which have semi-numeric "VF" call signs. Higher-power rebroadcasters are generally licensed under the call sign of the originating station, followed by a numeric suffix and, for FM re-broadcasters of an AM station, a "–FM" suffix. For example, CJBC-1-FM rebroadcasts CJBC (860 Toronto), whereas CJBC-FM-1 rebroadcasts CJBC-FM (90.3 Toronto). Some rebroadcasters, however, may have their own distinct call signs.

Canadian television stations use the "-TV" suffix, with the exception of those CBC-owned stations which have a call sign in the "CB-(-)T" format. Canadian digital transitional television undertakings have "-DT" suffixes, even where the base call sign is a CBC/Radio-Canada O&O in pattern "CB(insert third letter)T", "CB(insert third letter)ET" or "CB(insert third letter)FT" (respectively for English language or French language television). For instance, Ici Radio-Canada Télé's O&O CBOFT-DT would represent "CBC Ottawa Français Télévision - Digital Television". Canada does not use the "-LP" or "-CA" suffixes that are in use in the United States.

For rebroadcasters which use a numeric suffix, the suffixes usually follow a 1–2–3 numeric sequence, which indicates the chronological order in which rebroadcast transmitters were added. There are some cases where television rebroadcasters are suffixed with the channel number on which the transmitter broadcasts (for instance, CIII-DT's rebroadcasters are numbered with their channel assignment rather than sequentially), but this is not generally the norm.

Amateur radio

Innovation, Science and Economic Development Canada regulates all aspects of amateur radio in the country. It assigns call signs, issues amateur radio licences, conducts exams, allots frequency spectrum, and monitors transmissions.

Canadian amateur radio stations call signs generally begin with "VE", "VA", “VO” or "VY". The number following these letters indicates the province, going from "VA1"/"VE1" for Nova Scotia, "VA2"/"VE2" (Québec), "VE3"/"VA3" (Ontario) through "VA7"/"VE7" for British Columbia and "VE8" for the Northwest Territories, with latecomer "VE9" for New Brunswick. ("VE1" used to be for all three Maritime provinces.) "VE0" is for maritime mobile amateur transmissions. "VY1" is used for the Yukon Territory, "VY2" for Prince Edward Island, and "VY0" for Nunavut. "CY0" and "CY9" are Sable Island (population 5) and St. Paul Island (uninhabited); with little or no local population, reception of these distant points is rare, although amateur radio stations do temporarily operate from these islands during shortwave radio contests. Special prefixes are often issued for stations operating at significant events.

While not directly related to call signs, the International Telecommunication Union (ITU) has further divided all countries assigned amateur radio prefixes into three regions; Canada is located in ITU Region 2. These regions are further divided into two overlapping zone systems: the ITU zone and the CQ zone.

The Dominion of Newfoundland prefix "VO" remains in active use by amateurs in the province of Newfoundland and Labrador, VO1AA atop Signal Hill in St. Johns being the most famous amateur station. Radio amateurs on the Island of Newfoundland use calls beginning with "VO1", while Labrador amateurs use "VO2". A popular backronym for "VO" stations is "Voice of...", although prefixes do not have any official meaning.

There are 68,000 licensed operators in Canada with call signs. The Canadian federal government's Innovation, Science and Economic Development Canada allots the individual call signs to the radio amateurs it licenses.  There are 24 possible 2-letter prefixes and 240 2-letter/1-number prefixes available to Canadian operators based on the ITU blocks (CF–CK, CY–CZ, VA–VG, VO, VX–VY and XJ–XO).  There are potentially approximately 4,340,000 call signs available in Canada.

Of these prefixes, 5 are currently assigned (CY, VA, VE, VO, and VY) for normal amateur radio operation. Innovation, Science and Economic Development Canada  assigns regular operating call signs from 25 prefix/numeral blocks (e.g. VE1, CY9....).  The other prefixes are assigned for special event operation for a time-limited period.

For Canadian amateur licences, suffixes of radio call signs usually comprise two or three letters, the former being available only to amateurs who have been licensed for 5 years or more.  Amateurs can hold only one two-letter suffix call sign, but as many three-letter suffix call signs as they wish.

There are 18,252 possible combinations of two- or three-letter suffix call signs per prefix. Innovation, Science and Economic Development Canada follows Article 19 of the ITU Radio Regulations by disallowing 156 suffix-combinations because they may be confused with 3-letter communications signals (i.e. Q-codes) or other combinations which can be confused with distress signals.  The Recommendation ITU-R M.1172  lists groups of letters from QOA to QUZ as abbreviations and signals to be used in radiotelegraphy communications.  'SOS' is also generally excluded, however the old distress call of 'CQD' can be allocated.

For occasional special events, 1-, 4-, or -5 letter suffixes can be assigned to a licensed operator for a specific period of time.

Canada is assigned DXCC entity #1, with the exception of Sable Is. and St.-Paul Is. which are DXCC entities #211 & #252 respectively.  Call sign prefixes are issued according to one's province or territory of residence by the following table:

Special event call signs
Innovation, Science and Economic Development Canada reserves the right to issue temporary special event call signs to licensed amateurs using the other available prefixes.

Typically, for national or regional observances licensed amateurs add their suffix to the assigned special event prefix as per the following explanation.  An individual amateur may apply for a single special event callsign that has any of the 24 prefixes and an appropriate suffix related to the event.  For instance, VA3OR received the special event call CF3NAVY from June 4 to July 3, 2010 to commemorate the 100th Anniversary of the Royal Canadian Navy.  In 1973 for the centennial of the RCMP a call sign VE3RCMP was issued and used from N division in Ottawa from April to November. The operators were all members of the RCMP who were also amateur radio operators.

For the special national event commemorating the 2010 Vancouver Olympics, from February 1, to March 31, 2010 amateurs could substitute VG for VA, VX for VE, XJ for VO, XK for VY so that an amateur with call sign VE3AAA could use VX3AAA, or VY0AAA could use XK0AAA.

Call Signs with more than one numeral
Some special event call signs have been issued with more than one numeral.  For instance, VE2008VQ was issued for the 400th anniversary of the founding of Québec City from June 28 to July 27, 2008.  Also, CG200I was issued for the 200th Anniversary of the Lighthouse of L'Ile Verte (Green Island), Québec.

Technically speaking, the first digit is the numeral separating prefix from the suffix, and the rest are part of the suffix.

Automobile licence plates for amateur operators
Canadian provincial and territorial motor vehicle licensing authorities can issue special licence plates to amateurs resident in their jurisdiction.  In British Columbia, the ICBC application form clearly allows only call signs beginning with VE7 or VA7, but calls from other jurisdictions sometimes slip through.

Reciprocal agreement with the United States
Under a reciprocal agreement between the United States and Canada, United States citizens licensed by the FCC can use their call sign within Canada as long as they affix the appropriate Canadian area-prefix to the end of their American call sign.  For instance, a United States amateur with call sign W6AAA operating in British Columbia would sign as W6AAA/VE7.

Other services
The "CG" prefix is used by Canadian Coast Guard stations and ship-to-shore radio on federally owned ships. Coast Guard Radio stations have also used "VA" through "VF". Individual ships will use call signs with a Canadian two-letter prefix (such as "CF", "CY", "CZ", "VB", "VC" or "VY") followed by a four-digit number. Aircraft are identified with a prefix such as "CF" or "CG" followed by three letters. Military radio fixed stations also bear call signs in the CF–CK, CY–CZ, VE and VX–VY series. Environment Canada weather stations have call signs of three letters and three numbers, issued from various "C", "V" or "X" Canadian prefix series.

Experimental television stations in Canada had call signs beginning with "VX9".

History of call sign allocation

Before 1913
Prior to adoption of the Radiotelegraphic Act on June 6, 1913, in most cases radio station owners adopted call letters of their own choosing. By 1912 most Marconi Company-owned commercial stations, including those in Canada, had three-letter call signs starting with "M", while other stations commonly were given calls that reflected a station's location or its owner's initials. One exception was the amateur radio operators belonging to The Wireless Association of Ontario, who were assigned three-letter call signs by the club that began with the letter "X", followed by the first letter of the member's surname, and closing with a sequentially assigned third letter.

1913
In 1912 the first International Radiotelegraph Convention was held in London. This conference established an International Bureau in Berne, Switzerland, which allocated initial letters for call signs issued to stations within various jurisdictions, and in the Bureau's April 23, 1913 circular "Canada (British)" was assigned VAA–VGZ. (The series VOA–VOZ was assigned to "Newfoundland (British)".) These allocations only covered commercial stations, and a broadcasting station category did not yet exist.

Amateur and experimental stations were not yet included in the international assignments. For these stations, the federal government assigned three-letter call signs, starting with "XAA", that were issued in alphabetical order. Experimental stations later received call letters from a separate alphabetical sequence, starting with XWA in Montreal.

Post World War I 
Most civilian radio stations were shut down by the federal government during World War I. After the war, the call letters in the range CFA–CKZ were assigned to "British Colonies and Protectorates", and in 1920 this assignment was divided between Canada, which received "CF", "CH", "CJ" and "CK", Australia, which was assigned "CG", and Newfoundland, which was given "CI".

Canada silenced its amateur stations from August 1914 to May 1, 1919. Concurrent with the restoration of amateur station licensing, there was a change to alphanumeric call signs, consisting of a regional number from 1 to 5, followed by two letters. Training Schools followed a similar policy, with an initial digit of 6, with Experimental stations call signs now starting with the digit 9.

As international communication became more frequent, Canadian amateurs informally began using a prefix of 'C' in front of their assigned alphanumeric call sign, and Americans similarly used a 'U' as a prefix.  On February 1, 1927, European countries began using a two-letter prefix beginning with 'E' in front of their regional identifying numbers.  Following that practise North American operators put a leading "N" in front of their calls, so that Canada's prefix became "NC" and Americans used "NU". For example a British Columbia amateur would sign their transmissions with a prefix of NC5.

1922
Radio broadcasting began to appear in the early 1920s. Initially there was not a separate category for stations making broadcasts intended for the general public, so the earliest broadcasts were sent by stations operating under standard amateur and experimental licences. In early 1922 two new licence categories were added: "Private Commercial Broadcasting station" and "Amateur Broadcasting station". In late April 1922 an initial group of twenty-three commercial broadcasting station licenses was announced, which received four-letter call signs starting with "CF", "CH", "CJ" or "CK", plus one additional "C" as the third or fourth letter. Stations in the Amateur Broadcasting station category received alphanumeric call signs starting with the number "10".

Canada has traditionally made use of a few call letter prefixes outside of those assigned to the country. In the 1920s exceptions were made for three regular Canadian National Railways broadcasting stations, CNRA in Moncton, CNRV in Vancouver and CNRO in Ottawa, plus the railway's "phantom stations" operating on time leased from other stations. When the Canadian Radio Broadcasting Commission took over the Canadian National Railway stations in 1932 and began to buy other stations, the prefix "CRC" was reserved for its exclusive use, including CRCT (formerly CKGW) and CRCY (formerly CKNC) in Toronto. In 1936 the Canadian Broadcasting Corporation succeeded the Canadian Radio Broadcasting Commission. Its stations were assigned call letters starting with "CB", and in Toronto CRCT became CBL and CRCY became CBY. In the early 1930s the Canadian Pacific Railway held a phantom station licence for Toronto, which held the call letters CPRY.

1929
At the International Radiotelegraph Convention (Washington, 1927) Canada was assigned the call letters blocks CFA–CKZ and VAA–VGZ. These came into force January 1, 1929, and amateur radio stations were now included in the ITU lettering scheme. Initially all amateur radio stations were given the prefix "VE" which replaced informal use of "NC", a prefix in use by the United States Navy.

1946–1949
Following World War II, the International Telecommunication Convention (Atlantic City, 1947) met and refined the international call sign blocks. Canada was assigned CFA–CKZ, CYA–CZZ, VAA–VGZ, VXA–VYZ, XJA–XOZ and 3BA–3FZ. These came into force January 1, 1949.  The 3BA–3FZ block eventually was reallocated between Mauritius, Equatorial Guinea, Kingdom of Swaziland, Fiji, and Panama. 

The Canadian government reformatted amateur call signs according to this table.

1949 – 1999
In 1949 Newfoundland and Labrador joined with Canada and the VOA–VOZ block of prefixes came with them.  In 1954 the federal government made VE0 available to Canadian operators in international waters.  The additions to the 1946 prefixes are summarized as:

See also 
 List of television stations in Canada by call sign
 Amateur radio international operation
 Radio Amateurs of Canada
 ITU prefix – amateur and experimental stations
 Amateur radio license

References

External links
 "Amateur Radio Service" (Innovation, Science and Economic Development Canada)
Innovation, Science and Economic Development "List of Available Call Signs For Broadcast Stations" (CF-CK only)
"The Call Letters of Canadian Stations" - Canadian Communication Foundation
 Radio Amateurs of Canada
 Radio Amateur du Québec

Canada
Broadcasting in Canada